The Columbia Agriculture Park is a public park in Columbia, Missouri focusing on food production and distribution. It is home to the Columbia Farmers Market, and contains a pavilion with space for 98 vendors. The park opened in 2019 and by 2021 will include an interactive urban farm, demonstration gardens and orchards, a commercial kitchen, event space, a recreational trail, amphitheater, outdoor classroom, and playground. It will also house the offices of the Columbia Center for Urban Agriculture and a resource center. The park was created by a public-private partnership between Columbia Parks and Recreation, the Columbia Farmers Market, the Columbia Center for Urban Agriculture, and Sustainable Farms and Communities. It is the first of its kind in Missouri.

History
The site has a long agricultural history, for most of the 20th century it was the location of the Boone County Fair. Ground was broken in 2017 and the park opened in July 2019.

References

External links
Columbia Farmers Market
Columbia Center for Urban Agriculture
Campaign for the Agriculture Park

Parks in Columbia, Missouri
Tourist attractions in Columbia, Missouri
Farmers' markets in the United States
Urban agriculture
Community gardening in the United States